Mitre Peak can refer to:

 Mitre Peak, New Zealand (1692 m)
 Mitre Peak, Pakistan (6010 m)

See also
 Mitre, New Zealand (1571 m)